Yarula is a municipality in the Honduran department of La Paz.

Demographics
At the time of the 2013 Honduras census, Yarula municipality had a population of 8,844. Of these, 92.05% were Indigenous (91.88% Lenca), 7.86% Mestizo, 0.05% White and 0.05% Black or Afro-Honduran.

References

Municipalities of the La Paz Department (Honduras)